Denys Lukashov (born 30 April 1989) is a Ukrainian basketball player for Prometey of the Latvian-Estonian Basketball League and the EuroCup. He is a member of the Ukrainian national team, where he participated at the EuroBasket 2015.

Honours

Club
Budivelnyk Kyiv
Ukrainian Cup: 2010–11
Lietuvos rytas
Lithuanian Cup: 2016

Individual
Ukrainian SuperLeague MVP: 2014–15

References

1989 births
Living people
BC Avtodor Saratov players
BC Azovmash players
BC Budivelnyk players
BC Donetsk players
BC Enisey players
BC Kyiv players
BC Prometey players
BC Prienai players
BC Rytas players
Point guards
Sportspeople from Donetsk
Ukrainian expatriate basketball people in Lithuania
Ukrainian expatriate basketball people in Russia
Ukrainian men's basketball players